Debbie Arden Brill,  (born March 10, 1953) is a Canadian high jump athlete who at the age of 16 became the first North American woman to clear 6 feet. Her reverse jumping style—which is now almost exclusively the technique of elite high jumpers—was called the Brill Bend and was developed by her when she was a child, around the same time as Dick Fosbury was developing the similar Fosbury Flop in the US. Brill won gold in the high jump at the 1970 Commonwealth Games, and at the Pan American Games in 1971. She finished 8th in the 1972 Summer Olympics, then quit the sport in the wake of the Munich massacre, returning three years later. She won gold at the IAAF World Cup in 1979, and at the 1982 Commonwealth Games. She has held the Canadian high jump record since 1969, and set the current record of 1.99 meters in 1982, a few months after giving birth to her first child.

Career
Brill was born in Mission, British Columbia, one of five children of a Canadian father and an American mother. She developed her style of jumping as a preteen on the family farm when her father made a landing pit containing foam rubber. Fifty years later she described it as "a natural extension of what my body was telling me to do. It was physical intuition; it wasn't anything taught." The technique, which involved jumping over the bar with her face to the sky and landing on her back, was dubbed the "Brill bend". Her clubmates thought it was unique until they learned that an older American athlete, Dick Fosbury, was becoming known for using the same technique.

Brill started competing provincially in British Columbia in 1966, at age 13. The following year, she competed at the Canadian national level. Her first international competition was in 1968, at age 15. In 1970, at age 17, she became the first woman in the western hemisphere to jump 6 ft (1.83 m).

Brill has held the Canadian National High Jump record since 1969, establishing her first Canadian High Jump record when she was 16. As of 2017, Brill's Canadian records still stand. She won the gold medal at the first Pacific Conference Games in 1969. She would again win the Pacific Conference Games title in 1977.

Brill won the 1970 Commonwealth Games in Edinburgh, Scotland, UK, and was presented with the gold medal by Queen Elizabeth. She won the 1971 Pan Am Games. Brill came in eighth at the 1972 Olympics in Munich. She campaigned to have the Games stopped after the Munich massacre, and retired after the Games, becoming disillusioned with the Olympic experience. She returned to competition in 1975 and placed 4th at the Pan Am Games. At the 1976 Montreal Olympics she was eliminated after failing three times at the opening height, and was criticized for laughing in a subsequent interview, although she wrote afterwards that she was disappointed by her failure. She placed 3rd at the first World Cup in 1977, and won a silver medal at home in Edmonton, at the 1978 Commonwealth Games. In 1979 Brill won a gold medal in the athletics World Cup held in Montreal, Canada. She was the world's number one high jumper for 1979.

Having been ranked number one in the world by Track and Field News in 1979, Brill was one of the favourites going into the 1980 Olympics which Canada boycotted because of the U.S.S.R.'s military involvement in Afghanistan. In January 1982, Brill established a World Indoor High Jump record of 1.99 meters in Edmonton, Alberta, 5 months after giving birth to her first son, Neil. She has a daughter, Katelin, and a son, Jacob. She is married to a physician, Dr. Douglas Coleman. She was again Commonwealth Champion in 1982 at the games in Brisbane.

From 1970 to 1985, in the annual Track and Field News merit rankings, Brill was ranked in the world's top ten for the high jump twelve times (the exceptions being 1973, 74, 76 and 81; with 76 being the only active year of the four). She was ranked in the top 5 six times. The only female high jumpers with more top ten rankings are Inha Babakova and Stefka Kostadinova, both with thirteen.

In 1983, Brill was made an Officer of the Order of Canada in recognition for being "Canada's premier woman high-jumper". In 2012, she was awarded the Queen Elizabeth II Diamond Jubilee Medal.

In 1999, at the age of 46, Brill broke the world masters record (age 45+) when she cleared 1.76 metres in Gateshead. In 2004, she broke the age 50+ masters record by clearing 1.60 m in Langley. As of 2016, Brill's world age group records still stand.

Achievements

Records
 Canadian National High Jump Record – 1.98 m (1984, has held national record since 1969)
 Canadian National Indoor Record – 1.99 m (1982, former world indoor record)
 World Masters Record (W45+) – 1.76 (1999)
 World Masters Record (W50+) – 1.60 m (2004)

National titles
 11 times Canadian National High Jump Champion – 1968-71,1974,1976,1978,1980,1982-1984
 2 times United States National High Jump Champion – 1979, 1982
 WAAA National (UK) High Jump Champion – 1971

Note: At the 1976 Olympic Games, Brill had three failures at her opening height of 1.75 m in the qualifying round.

References

External links
 
 
 
 
 
 Canadian Championships at gbrathletics.com

1953 births
Living people
Canadian female high jumpers
Sportspeople from British Columbia
People from Mission, British Columbia
Olympic track and field athletes of Canada
Athletes (track and field) at the 1972 Summer Olympics
Athletes (track and field) at the 1976 Summer Olympics
Athletes (track and field) at the 1984 Summer Olympics
Commonwealth Games medallists in athletics
Commonwealth Games gold medallists for Canada
Commonwealth Games silver medallists for Canada
Athletes (track and field) at the 1970 British Commonwealth Games
Athletes (track and field) at the 1978 Commonwealth Games
Athletes (track and field) at the 1982 Commonwealth Games
Athletes (track and field) at the 1986 Commonwealth Games
Pan American Games medalists in athletics (track and field)
Pan American Games gold medalists for Canada
Pan American Games bronze medalists for Canada
Athletes (track and field) at the 1971 Pan American Games
Athletes (track and field) at the 1975 Pan American Games
Athletes (track and field) at the 1979 Pan American Games
World Athletics Championships athletes for Canada
Universiade medalists in athletics (track and field)
Canadian masters athletes
Officers of the Order of Canada
Universiade silver medalists for Canada
World Athletics Indoor Championships medalists
Medalists at the 1977 Summer Universiade
Medalists at the 1971 Pan American Games
Medalists at the 1979 Pan American Games
Medallists at the 1970 British Commonwealth Games
Medallists at the 1978 Commonwealth Games
Medallists at the 1982 Commonwealth Games